This list of islands of California is organized into sections, generally arranged from north to south. The islands within each section are listed in alphabetical order.

The Geographic Names Information System (GNIS) lists 527 named islands in the state.

Humboldt County

Offshore

Humboldt Bay
All three islands in Humboldt Bay are located in the narrow midsection of the bay. This portion of the bay is located within the City of Eureka, California entirely within Humboldt County.

Northern California

San Francisco Bay Area

Other islands of the San Francisco Bay Area:

Farallon Islands
They consist of over twenty small islets divided into north, south and middle sections, as well as a major bank, Fanny Shoal. The surrounding waters were once used as a disposal site for radioactive waste.

Suisun Bay and Sacramento-San Joaquin River delta

Suisun Bay

Suisun Bay is an arm of the San Francisco Bay estuary which connects the Sacramento and San Joaquin rivers to the Carquinez Strait.

Sacramento-San Joaquin River Delta
The Sacramento-San Joaquin River Delta is an inverted delta at the juncture of the Sacramento and San Joaquin rivers. There are about 57 named islands in the Delta.

Channel Islands
The Channel Islands are a group of eight main islands and several minor islands in the Pacific Ocean off the coast of Santa Barbara, Los Angeles, and Ventura counties in Southern California. The four northern islands are protected in Channel Islands National Park, while two are used by the U.S. Navy. These Islands are part of the Greater Los Angeles Area.

Greater Los Angeles Area
The Greater Los Angeles Area is an urban area on the Pacific coast of southern California.

Newport Bay
The bay associated with Newport Harbor and the city of Newport Beach, California.

Lake islands

River islands

Miscellaneous

See also

Geography of California
List of islands of the United States
Outline of California

References

Further reading

External links

 California Department of Water Resources.ca.gov: Delta Waterways

Islands
California